Israel Perales Ortiz (September 1, 1972 – July 23, 2015) better known by his stage name Mexicano 777, was a Puerto Rican rapper who gained fame across Latin America, and in the United States. Mexicano 777 was from Yabucoa, Puerto Rico, and was considered to be one of the pioneers of Latin hip hop and reggaeton.

Career beginnings 
His ability to sing was unveiled by parents and siblings when Perales went to take a shower and began to sing. As he came out of the bathroom everyone was waiting in front of the door asking how he had learned the songs he was singing (those of Pedrito Fernández). All this happened when Perales was just six years old. At this young age he was already to duplicate the voice of Fernandez. Therefore after, the young singer began taking part in various school activities such as plays, recitals, musicals. Soon after people would start calling him by his nickname "Mexicano".

1990s
Mexicano 777 began his musical career during the early 1990s, alongside such artists as DJ Playero and DJ Adam. First with Adam he wrote "Se Testigo" and won the "Best New Style Award". During this time, hip hop in Puerto Rico was at a popular high, and artists from this era included him, Vico C, Eddie Dee, Don Chezina, and MC Ceja.

In 1993, Perales Ortiz allegedly participated in an armed robbery of a Fajardo restaurant, in which he was accused of pulling a firearm on employees and taking off with $2,000 dollars in cash.

In 1996, his hit "Desde La Isla De La Muerte" formed part of the "Guatauba" release in New York together with Tony Touch, one of the most known hispanic DJs. He would later make a music video for said song.

Mexicano 777 collaborated with Fat Joe in 1997 on the song "No Mas Tregua". The song was featured on the 1997 album Boricua Guerrero First Combat. Also in 1997, his song "Razor Sharp" together with Curly y Demus from Boricua Guerrero EP opened the door for the international market. On June 22, 1997, Mexicano 777 was at a discothèque when a shooting took place. He held 19 year old Laura Isabel Aponte Rivera on his hands and prayed before she was taken to a hospital, where she died of a gunshot to the head. Aponte Rivera's mother Myra Rivera credited Mexicano 777 with helping her see her daughter at the hospital before she died.

His first album "Entre El Bien y El Mal" would be released in September of 1998 which included popular picks such as "Bendición Mami," "Hagan Ruido Las Pistolas Featuring Tempo," y "Un Alma Inocente." He directed the corresponding music videos for the songs which reached an all time high popularity. He was later named "Rap Artist of the Year" in Puerto Rico.

2000s
Mexicano 777's 2001 album, "God's Assassin" became a major musical and cultural hit selling 200,000 records. The album included 14 songs, including a collaboration, "Guerreros" ("Warriors") with another artist also known as "Mexicano 777", Mad Lion.

Also in 2001, he released "El Colmo de los Fujitivos" ("The Last of the Fugitives"), which included "El Boricua Poeta" ("The Puerto Rican Poet"). Mexicano recorded the albums while in prison. He spent 7 years in prison for the robbery he committed in 1993. 

In 2005, Mexicano 777 released "Pa' La Kalle 1972-The Beginning" ("To The Streets 1972-The Beginning"), which was released under the Universal Music Latino label. On this CD, he had collaborations with Ivy Queen (on a major hit named "Madre No Llores"-"Mother, don't Cry") and with Arcángel & De La Ghetto (on "Im' a Murdera-Como Tiemblan"-Im a Murderer-See Them Shaking").

In 2008, Mexicano 777 returned to the music charts in Puerto Rico with "Septimo Elemento" ("Seventh Element"). 

And in 2009, he released his final album "El Demente Sicario De La Liríca ("The Insane Hitman Of The Lyric").

2010s
It was during 2010 that Mexicano 777 was initially diagnosed with throat and tongue cancer, which led to eventually retiring from releasing albums.

In 2011 after a successful throat and tongue cancer surgical operation, Mexicano 777 would perform live in concert in Chile. However, he was diagnosed with throat and tongue cancer again in 2013.

Early in 2013, Mexicano 777's pregnant daughter, 21-year-old Edith Noemi Perales Aguirre, was found by her 16-year-old brother, murdered. Late in September 2013, two Fajardo residing brothers were arrested by police on suspicion of her murder as well as those of two local men.

Mexicano 777, who was at a Hogares Crea rehabilitation center in Arecibo at the time, vowed to avenge his daughter's death and escaped the rehab center on May 22, but he was caught soon after and was sentenced to three years in prison to be spent in Bayamon. Mexicano 777 had been at Hogares Crea after being sentenced to three years of probation, charged with domestic abuse.

Death
On June 1, 2015, Mexicano 777 was released after his sentence was reduced by one year so he could spend his final days with his family. He moved to his father's house in Manati, where he died from cancer on July 23. He was buried at Cementerio Viejo Municipal de Manatí.

See also
List of Puerto Ricans

References

1972 births
2015 deaths
20th-century Puerto Rican male singers
People from Yabucoa, Puerto Rico
Puerto Rican rappers
Deaths from cancer in Puerto Rico
Deaths from throat cancer
21st-century Puerto Rican male singers